Paradigm classification in ontology is a two-dimensional classification scheme, such as a spreadsheet. It is a subset of faceted classification.

Overview 
Paradigm classification deals with the large subset of faceted classification where an item may be classified within two dimensions. Examples might include genealogy, where individuals are classified by their gender and relations with other individuals.

References

External links 

How to Make a Faceted Classification and Put It On the Web
Ontology

Knowledge representation
Ontology